Charles V. Keating, CM (September 17, 1933 – November 22, 2005) was a Canadian businessman who was a director of Shaw Communications.

In 2002, he was made a Member of the Order of Canada. The Charles V. Keating Millennium Centre, a multi-purpose arena and conference centre at St. Francis Xavier University, is named after him.

External links
 Obituary, Chronicle-Herald, Halifax, Nova Scotia

1933 births
2005 deaths
20th-century Canadian businesspeople
Members of the Order of Canada